Pierre Londiche, born 27 September 1932, is a French actor and playwright.

Filmography
The Things of Life (1970)
 (1971)
 (1973)
Act of Aggression (1975)
The French Detective (1975)
Mado (1976)
 (1977)
 (1977)
 (1977)
 (1978)
The Dogs (1979)
Laura (1979)
La provinciale (1981)
 (1982)
Life Is a Bed of Roses (1983)
 (1983)
 (1984)
Mesrine (1984)
 (1984)
 (1985)
 (1986)
Cross (1987)
 (1988)
How I Killed My Father (2001)
 (2009)

Theatre

Publications
La Fugue en émoi (2013)

References

1932 births
Living people
20th-century French male actors
21st-century French dramatists and playwrights
People from Armentières